The Divizia A is the second level of the Romanian men's professional handball system. The league comprises twenty one teams.

History
This sport was first played in Romania in 1920. After a visit in Germany, a few physical education teachers introduced this sport in their classes. 
The Divizia A was founded in 1933 (in 11 players) and in 1958 in the current format with 7 players. The current champions are Știința Municipal Bacău (Seria A) and CSM Oradea (Seria B).

See also
 Women's Divizia A

References

External links 
 Romanian Handball Federation

 
Handball competitions in Romania
Romania
Sports leagues in Romania